The Hamilton Fincups were a Canadian junior ice hockey team in the Ontario Major Junior Hockey League for 4 years, from 1974 to 1978. The team played in Hamilton, Ontario for three years, and in St. Catharines, Ontario for one. The Hamilton Fincups played home games at the Barton Street Arena, also known as the Hamilton Forum from 1974–1976. The St. Catharines Fincups played in the Garden City Arena in downtown St. Catharines, Ontario in 1976–1977. After moving back to Hamilton, the Fincups played out of the Mountain Arena from 1977–1978.

History
The Fincups were a short-lived team in the Ontario Major Junior Hockey League that was very successful on the ice, but did poorly generating revenue. The club bounced around in three outdated arenas in four years. Unable to turn much of a profit, the Fincups moved out of town, becoming the Brantford Alexanders.

Fincup was a combination of the surnames of the team's owners, Joe Finochio and the Cupido brothers Ron and Mario. They renamed the old Hamilton Red Wings after the 1974 season; the franchise had history in Steeltown dating back to the early 1950s. The new owners did not have to go far to hire a new coach for the new regime as they hired a very young Bert Templeton as the team's new coach (Bert was coaching the Junior B team in Hamilton owned by Cupido and Finochio) which had just won the Jr B championship (Sutherland cup). Templeton was voted winner of the Matt Leyden Trophy as Coach of the Year in his first season. Templeton was let go partway through the Fincups' fourth season due to conflict with ownership and replaced by Dave Draper.

In the four short seasons that the Fincups played, the team won the Memorial Cup once, and the J. Ross Robertson Cup once. The Fincups also represented Canada at the World Junior Tournament and came away with a silver medal.

The Fincups won the Emms Division regular season title for two consecutive years in 1975–76 and 1976–77, and the Hamilton Spectator Trophy in 1976–77 as the first overall team in the OHA regular season.

The Fincups made the OHA finals all 3 years they played out of Hamilton, and came within one win of making it four consecutive appearances in the championship series in their only year in St. Catharines.

The franchise issued a set of 18 sports cards for the 1974-75 season.

Memorial Cup 1976
The Hamilton Fincups of 1976 were a small, hard-working and determined team which practiced meticulously and strived to be top in condition. Their hard work won the Emms division regular season in 1976 and eliminated the Kitchener Rangers, Toronto Marlboros and the Sudbury Wolves to make to the Memorial Cup hosted at the Montreal Forum. Their opponents for the 1976 national title would be the WHL's New Westminster Bruins and the QMJHL's Quebec Remparts.

Hamilton lost the first game of the round-robin to Quebec 4-3, due to the 45 save performance of the Remparts goalie Maurice Barrette. The Bruins would defeat the Remparts the next day 4-2. The third game saw the Fincups score seven power play goals to beat the Bruins 8-4 in a game with many penalties, which concluded the round-robin.

The win and the large goal differential put Hamilton directly into the final game. New Westminster would solidly beat Quebec 10-3 in the semi-final game. The next day in front of 4,350 fans at the Montreal Forum, the Fincups played a tenacious forechecking game and defeated the New Westminster Bruins 5-2 in Memorial Cup Final game. The win brought the Memorial Cup back to the "Steel City" for the first time in 14 years.

Instability

The team's move to St. Catharines, Ontario in 1977 was necessitated by the closure of the old Barton Street Arena in Hamilton. During the 1976 Memorial Cup run, the Hamilton Spectator was filled with speculation about a possible move to Brantford, Ontario, as the old arena in Hamilton was obviously on its last legs. However, the city of Hamilton refused to make a decision about a new arena, and debated whether to build a 5,000-seat building for the Fincups or a 16,000 seat arena in hopes of pursuing a World Hockey Association team. In August 1976, the ice-making machinery in the dilapidated, 67-year-old barn broke down and Fincup ownership, who also owned the building, chose to demolish the battered, ancient arena rather than repair it. The team was unable to negotiate a short-term lease to use the only other semi-suitable arena in Hamilton, the Mountain Arena, due to opposition from local residents, and so the homeless team was forced to move to St. Catharines, Ontario, about thirty minutes down the QEW, who had recently witnessed the departure of their own OMJHL team, the Black Hawks.

Team ownership was able to negotiate a lease for Mountain Arena for the 1977-78 OHL season, but at the end of the year the city of Hamilton was still no closer to building a new arena than they had been two years earlier. Moreover, the team was losing money at the tiny, out of the way Mountain Arena. Out of long-term options in Hamilton, the team was moved at the end of that season to Brantford, where they were renamed the Brantford Alexanders.

Players

The heart and soul of the Fincups was their captain Dale McCourt. He led the team to the Memorial Cup title in 1976, and the Hamilton Spectator Trophy in 1977. He was voted CHL Player of the year for his efforts. There are 21 Fincups alumni who made the NHL.

Award winners
1974–75 - Danny Shearer, Emms Family Award Rookie of the Year
1975–76 - Mark Locken, F.W. 'Dinty' Moore Trophy Best Rookie GAA
1975–76 - Dale McCourt, William Hanley Trophy Most Sportsmanlike Player
1976–77 - Dale McCourt, William Hanley Trophy Most Sportsmanlike Player
1976–77 - Dale McCourt, Red Tilson Trophy Most Outstanding Player
1976–77 - Dale McCourt, Canadian Hockey League Player of the Year
1977–78 - Rick Wamsley, Dave Pinkney Trophy Lowest Team GAA

NHL alumni

Yearly results

Regular season

Playoffs
1974–1975 Defeated St. Catharines Black Hawks 8 points to 0 in quarter finals. Defeated Peterborough Petes 8 points to 4 in semi-finals. Lost to Toronto Marlboros 8 points to 6 in OHA Finals.
1975–1976 Defeated Kitchener Rangers in quarter-finals 8 points to 0. Defeated Toronto Marlboros in semi-finals 9 points to 1. Defeated Sudbury Wolves in OHA Finals 8 points to 2. OHA CHAMPIONS Defeated New Westminster Bruins 5-2 in Memorial Cup Final. MEMORIAL CUP CHAMPIONS
1976–1977 Defeated Windsor Spitfires in quarter-finals 4 games to 2. Lost to London Knights in semi-finals 4 games to 3, with 1 tie.
1977–1978 Defeated Windsor Spitfires in quarter-finals 9 points to 3. Defeated London Knights in semi-finals 9 points to 5. Lost to Peterborough Petes in OHA Finals 8 points to 6.

References

External links
Hamilton Forum
Garden City Arena 
Mountain Arena

1974 establishments in Ontario
1978 disestablishments in Ontario
Defunct Ontario Hockey League teams
[Category:Ice hockey clubs established in 1974]]
Ice hockey teams in Hamilton, Ontario
Sport in St. Catharines
Sports clubs disestablished in 1978